Give Seven Days, also known as Destiny of Love, is a 2014 Chinese romantic comedy film directed by Tang Xu. It was released on November 21, 2014.
Remake of the U.S.A. movie "The Holiday" (2006).

Cast
Yu Vicky (Yu Xintian)
Yin Zheng
Xu Cenzi
Wong Kiray
Yvonne Yung
Jing Gangshan
Li Bin
Zhang He
Shan Ye

Reception

Box office
By November 25, 2014, the film had earned ¥0.15 million at the Chinese box office.

References

2014 romantic comedy films
Chinese romantic comedy films